Nicholas Hare Architects is a UK architectural practice, with a portfolio of award-winning projects.  These include schools, higher education, refurbishment, commercial projects, and buildings for the arts.  Founded by Nicholas Hare in 1977, the practice is now a limited liability partnership with over 50 employees.  The office is based in an old book-binding factory in Barnsbury Square in Islington.  Nicholas Hare Architects LLP is a member of the UK Green Building Council and achieves BREEAM Excellent rating for several of its completed buildings.

Notable buildings

Notable buildings include:
 Golden Lane Campus next to the Barbican
 Brunei Gallery for the University of London
 UK Headquarters building for Nokia in Farnborough for Segro
 Science Building & Drama Centre for St Paul's School, London
 Joseph Chamberlain Sixth Form College Birmingham 
 Sadler's Wells Theatre in Islington 
 Richard Doll Building for the University of Oxford 
 Education & Simulation Centre for the Royal College of Surgeons of England
 Student Services Centre for the University of Southampton 
 The David Attenborough Building at the University of Cambridge
 Alison Richard Building on the Sidgwick Site at the University of Cambridge
 Roald Dahl Plass in Cardiff, Wales
 Headquarters Complex in Farnborough for Segro
 Royal College of Obstetricians and Gynaecologists London 
 Hawkshead Campus Gateway Building, Royal Veterinary College
 Cornelius Vermuyden School on Canvey Island 
 Research and Development building for NOKIA in Farnborough for Segro
 UK Headquarters building in Slough for O2.
 Production Workshop and new Costume Centre in Thurrock for the Royal Opera House
 Royal Courts building in Guernsey

Awards
The practice won the Prime Minister's 'Better Public Building' award for Joseph Chamberlain Sixth Form College in 2009.  The same project was awarded the RIBA/Learning and Skills Council Further Education Building Design Excellence Award.  Nicholas Hare Architects has won several Civic Trust Awards and commendations for several projects and was named Best School Architect at the British Council for School Environments Awards in 2009.

2017
 The David Attenborough Building, Winner AJ Retrofit Award, Winner: Offices (2,000m2-10,000m2)
 The David Attenborough Building, Education, RIBA Journal Schüco Excellence Awards
 The David Attenborough Building, Commended, British Construction Industry Award (BCIA)
 Christies Care Office Building Winner (Large New Building), RIBA Suffolk Craftsmanship Award

2016
 The David Attenborough Building, Cambridge Design & Construction Awards: Best Conservation Alteration or Extension Award & Engineering & Sustainability Project of the Year
 Royal Opera House, Costume Centre Thurrock Business Awards, Best Community Charity Award

2015
 St Paul's School Science Building, RIBA London Award
 Gloucester Academy, Commendation, Gloucester Civic Award
 Kettering Science Academy, Commendation, Civic Trust Awards
2014
 Bishop of Rochester Academy Highly Commended, AJ100 Value Excellence Award
 Woodlands School Winner - BIM Initiative of the Year, Heating & Ventilation Awards
 St Paul's School Science Building Highly Commended - Design Through Innovation, (Royal Institution of Chartered Surveyors) RICS London Awards
 St Paul's School Science Building Winner, Civic Trust Awards
 GreenPark, Reading Winner, Civic Trust Award
 Noel-Baker and St Martins School Derby Civic Society, Commendation (Top Prize)
 Noel-Baker and St Martins School Winner, RIBA East Midlands Award

2013
 Dormers Wells High School Winner, Ealing Civic Society Award
 Joseph Chamberlain Sixth Form College Top 20 projects in the West Midlands, MADE20 Design Awards
 Nicholas Hare Architects Overall Winner, Open City Architecture in Schools Primary Awards
 Woodlands SchoolWinner (Building) BIM Project Application, British Construction Industry Awards
 Strood Academy Best New Build, Medway Culture & Design Award
 Alison Richard Building Commendation, Cambridge Design and Construction Awards

2012
 Royal Opera House Production Workshop, RIBA East Spirit of Ingenuity Award
 Crown Woods College, RIBA London Regional Award
 Crown Woods College, Civic Trust Awards Commendation
 Alison Richard Building, Civic Trust Awards Commendation

2011
 High House Production Park Project of the Year and Regeneration & Conservation Award, Royal Institution of Chartered Surveyors (RICS), South East Region 2011
 Coleridge Primary School Winner, Civic Trust Awards

2009
 Park Hall School in Solihull Winner - Excellence in BSF: Best Design for a New School (also shortlisted in the Innovation in Sustainability Award), Partnership for Schools
 O2 Headquarters building in Slough The Architecture Award Winner, International Property and Commercial Awards
 Best School Architect, British Council for School Environments
 Winner - Inspiring Design, British Council for School Environments - Golden Lane Campus

2007
 The Richard Doll Building, University of Oxford, RIBA Award
 Student Services Centre, University of Southampton, RIBA Award

References

External links

News articles
 Sadlers Wells keeps listing but faces closure, Architects' Journal 
 Golden Lane Campus by Nicholas Hare Architects
 Joseph Chamberlain Sixth Form College in ArchDaily
 At Guernsey’s new Royal Court complex, the majesty of the law is given a commanding hill-top position and a contemporary welcoming feel
 Concrete Quarterly, St Paul's School: "Best days of its life"
Sustainability events at Nicholas Hare Architects' offices

Architecture firms based in London